This is a list of yearly Northern Sun Intercollegiate Conference football standings.

Northern Sun Intercollegiate Conference football standings

Early history

Northern Sun Intercollegiate Conference (1992–present)

References

Northern Sun Intercollegiate Conference
Standings